This is a list of albums and singles by Siti Nurhaliza where she has sold an estimated of more than 6 million records in Asian market especially in Malaysian and Indonesian markets out of her 15 years of singing career. Within five years, the sales for her first six albums have already reached 1 million units in the Malaysian market and another 500 000 units from the Indonesian market. Her debut album was revealed to sold more than 800,000 copies  and eight out of 15 of her solo albums have received either Gold, Platinum or multiple platinum certifications from Malaysia and Indonesia.

In 2000, her album sales alone contributed to 10 percent of Malaysia's total album sales. To date, her discography consists of 17 solo studio albums, 2 duet albums, 11 live albums, 9 compilation albums with more than 250 songs and singles. She has also released 70 music videos.

Albums

Studio albums

Special album

Collaborative albums

Live albums

Compilation albums

Solo compilation albums

Indonesian solo compilation albums

Duet/group compilation albums

Other albums

Instrumental albums

Remix album

Soundtracks

Other songs
Songs from Indonesian version of Siti's albums

Songs/singles from non-solo studio or duet compilation albums

Songs/singles from a group compilation or special works

Videography

Solo video albums

Solo compilation video albums

Special video albums

DVD albums

Duet video albums

Footnotes
 Note 1:  Recording Industry Association of Malaysia (RIM) divided the charts based on whether the albums are locally or internationally produced. It also has separate chart for compilation albums.
 Note 2:  This album could be charted higher than stated here, since the data by the Billboard starting to be available early 1997 whereas the album was released in April 1996.
 Note 3:  For an album that was produced before 2003, an album has to have achieved a sale of 50,000 units to get single Platinum certification.
 Note 4:  The sale for the first four months.
 Note 5:  Not to be confused with the song she entered for the 2009 1Malaysia song competition which also bears the same.

See also
 List of songs recorded by Siti Nurhaliza

References

Discographies of Malaysian artists
Pop music discographies
Discography